Kiger is a surname. Notable people with the surname include:

Susan Kiger (born 1953), American model and actress
Mark Kiger (born 1980), American retired professional baseball infielder

See also
Kiger Creek, tributary of Swamp Creek in Harney County in the U.S. state of Oregon
Kiger Island, island in Oregon
Kiger Mustang, strain of Mustang horse located in the southeastern part of the U.S. state of Oregon
Kiger Stadium, baseball stadium in Klamath Falls, Oregon
Renault Kiger, a subcompact crossover car model